The  was a professional wrestling championship owned by the New Japan Pro-Wrestling (NJPW) promotion. The title was officially announced on January 5, 2011 and the Inaugural Champion MVP was crowned on May 15, 2011 during NJPW's first tour of the United States. On March 4, 2021, the championship was retired by NJPW after being unified with the IWGP Heavyweight Championship to form the IWGP World Heavyweight Championship. The final champion was Kota Ibushi, who was in his second reign at the time of the title's retirement.

The title formed what was unofficially been called the "New Japan Triple Crown" (新日本トリプルクラウン, Shin Nihon Toripuru Kuraun) along with the IWGP Heavyweight Championship and the NEVER Openweight Championship.

History

Inaugural championship tournament
On October 3, 2010, American promotion Jersey All Pro Wrestling announced that it had reached an agreement with NJPW to co-promote NJPW's first shows in the United States. NJPW officially announced the NJPW Invasion Tour 2011: Attack on East Coast tour on January 4, 2011, with shows taking place on May 13 in Rahway, New Jersey, May 14 in New York City and May 15 in Philadelphia, Pennsylvania. The following day, NJPW added that, during the tour, the promotion would introduce the IWGP Intercontinental Championship, with the inaugural champion to be crowned in a tournament taking place over the three shows. Participants for the tournament were announced on April 8, 2011. The list of participants included: former World Wrestling Entertainment performer MVP, who had signed a contract with New Japan in January 2011; Kazuchika Okada, who had been on a learning excursion to American promotion Total Nonstop Action Wrestling (TNA) since February 2010; Hideo Saito, who had been on a similar tour of Puerto Rico's World Wrestling Council since September 2010; former IWGP Tag Team and IWGP Junior Heavyweight Tag Team Champions Tetsuya Naito and Yujiro Takahashi of No Limit; NJPW regulars Tama Tonga and Toru Yano, and; American independent worker Dan Maff, who made his first appearance for NJPW during the tour. On May 6, it was announced that Tonga had suffered an injury which would force him out of the tournament. He was replaced by former TNA and Ring of Honor performer Josh Daniels. On May 15, MVP defeated Yano in the final of the tournament to become the inaugural champion.

Tournament bracket

Nakamura and elevation

Through MVP's inaugural reign and the subsequent reigns of Masato Tanaka and Hirooki Goto, the IWGP Intercontinental Championship was largely a midcard title, remaining firmly behind the IWGP Heavyweight Championship and IWGP Tag Team Championship in importance. However, after Shinsuke Nakamura captured the title from Goto on July 22, 2012, the title began gaining importance. He was already a former three-time IWGP Heavyweight Champion and his first reign lasted  days. Nakamura also made the title international again, defending it in both the United States and Mexico. On May 31, 2013, while on tour with Mexican promotion Consejo Mundial de Lucha Libre (CMLL), with whom NJPW has a working relationship, Nakamura lost the title to La Sombra. This marked the first time the title had changed hands outside of NJPW. Nakamura regained the title back in NJPW two months later on July 20, and in the process became the first two-time holder of the title.

Nakamura continued elevating the IWGP Intercontinental Championship, culminating with the IWGP Intercontinental Championship match receiving top billing over the IWGP Heavyweight Championship match at NJPW's biggest annual event, Wrestle Kingdom 8 on January 4, 2014, where former multi-time IWGP Heavyweight Champion Hiroshi Tanahashi became the new champion. Afterwards, Tokyo Sports wrote that the Intercontinental and Heavyweight Championships were now equals, while Dave Meltzer wrote that Nakamura and Tanahashi made the Intercontinental Championship feel like "the real world title belt". Nakamura regained the title from Tanahashi in another main event match on April 6 at Invasion Attack 2014. Nakamura's association with the championship continued to 2016, when he successfully defended it against former IWGP Heavyweight Champion A.J. Styles at Wrestle Kingdom 10. On January 25, 2016, Nakamura was stripped of the title due to his departure from the promotion at the end of the month.

From 2012 to 2016, Nakamura held the IWGP Intercontinental Championship five times and defended it at four consecutive Wrestle Kingdom events.
The title was also associated with Nakamura as it was he who personally introduced the new title belt design shortly into his first reign in August 2012. He was outspokenly disapproving of the first belt design—which had bronze plates on a black strap—for its resemblance to a 10 yen coin and saw it as a mockery of the IWGP. The new design featured gold plates on a white strap. The white strap was unprecedented for the IWGP, and symbolized a clean slate for its holder to add to and define.

Naito and unification with Heavyweight Championship
After Nakamura's departure, the title was most associated with Tetsuya Naito, who held the title for a record six times. During his first reign, he began systematically destroying the title belt, forcing NJPW to have it repaired in June 2017. Unlike Nakamura, Naito firmly saw the Heavyweight Championship as the top title, and had no desire for the Intercontinental Championship when he first won it. On January 5, 2020 at Wrestle Kingdom 14, Tetsuya Naito won the Heavyweight and Intercontinental Championships. Both titles keep their individual history, but were defended at the same time. Sometimes, they were called "Double Championship". On March 4, 2021, one year after Naito's victory, the titles were unified to form the new IWGP World Heavyweight Championship.

Reigns

During the championship's existence there have been twenty-seven reigns shared among fifteen wrestlers with one vacancy. MVP was the first champion in the title's history. Tetsuya Naito  has the most reigns with six. Shinsuke Nakamura holds the record for the longest reign in the title's history at 313 days during his first reign. Tetsuya Naito's second reign of 41 days is the shortest in the title's history. Kota Ibushi was the final champion and had held the championship twice.

Combined reigns

Belt design
The standard Championship belt has five plates on a white leather strap.

References

External links
Official title history at New Japan Pro-Wrestling.co.jp
Title history at Wrestling-Titles.com

New Japan Pro-Wrestling championships
Intercontinental professional wrestling championships